Romantica may refer to:

Music
Romantica (band), an Americana band
Romantica (album), a 2002 album by Luna
"Romántica", one of the 12 Danzas españolas (1890) for piano by Enrique Granados
"Romantica" (song), the winner of the Sanremo Music Festival and the Italian Eurovision Song Contest entry in 1960
”The Twins / Romantica”, a song from  Duster’s 1998 debut album [[Stratosphere (Duster album)| Stratosphere]].

Television 
Zone Romantica, a European TV channel owned by Zonemedia
Romantica (TV channel), a Romanian version of Zone Romantica

Other
Romantica, a trademark of the now-defunct Ellora's Cave for erotic romance novels